Saigneville is a commune in the Somme department in Hauts-de-France in northern France.

History
Prior to construction of the Canal de la Somme, Saigneville stood at the southern end of a ford across the Somme estuary. Known as Blanchetaque for the white stones marking the way, the ford became the site of the Battle of Blanchetaque in 1346, during the Hundred Years' War.

Geography

Population

See also
Communes of the Somme department

References

Communes of Somme (department)